The Hongji Bridge is a historic stone arch bridge over the Dongshi River in Nanxun, Huzhou, Zhejiang, China.

History
The bridge was firstly mentioned in the Prefecture Topography of Huzhou during the reign of Wanli Emperor in the Ming dynasty (1368–1644). In 1805, in the ruling of Jiaqing Emperor of the Qing dynasty (1644–1911), it was rebuilt by local people. On November 15, 1937, in order to stop the attack of the Imperial Japanese Army, the National Army blew up part of the bridge deck.

Architecture

References

Bridges in Zhejiang
Arch bridges in China
Bridges completed in 1805
Qing dynasty architecture
Buildings and structures completed in 1805
1805 establishments in China